Jerry Russell Tolley (born November 6, 1942) is an American football coach, educator and politician.  He served as the head football coach at Elon University from 1977 to 1981, compiling a record of 49–11–2. His 1980 and 1981 teams were both crowned NAIA national champions. He graduated from East Carolina University with a master's degree in education in 1966. He also received his Ph.D from University of North Carolina at Greensboro in 1982.

Tolley now serves as the Mayor of Elon, North Carolina.

Head coaching record

References

1942 births
Living people
East Carolina Pirates football players
Elon Phoenix football coaches
High school football coaches in North Carolina
Mayors of places in North Carolina
University of North Carolina at Greensboro alumni
People from Edenton, North Carolina
People from Goldsboro, North Carolina
Players of American football from North Carolina